Nicholas James Murphy (born 23 June 1988), known professionally as Chet Faker, is an Australian singer and songwriter. In 2012, as Chet Faker, he issued an extended play, Thinking in Textures, and signed to Downtown Records in the United States. In October 2012, he won Breakthrough Artist of the Year and Thinking in Textures won Best Independent Single/EP at the Australian Independent Records Awards. In January 2013, the work won Best Independent Release at the Rolling Stone Australia Awards for 2012.

Murphy's cover of Blackstreet's "No Diggity" was featured in a 2013 Super Bowl commercial for Beck's Sapphire. In April 2014, Built on Glass, his debut studio album, was released to generally positive reviews and debuted at number one on the Australian ARIA Charts. Three tracks from the album were voted into the top ten of Triple J's Hottest 100 of 2014, including the number one spot for "Talk Is Cheap".

In September 2016, Murphy dropped the Chet Faker name to start performing and releasing material under his birth name, beginning with the release of a pair of singles later that year, and the Missing Link extended play in 2017. Murphy's second studio album – the first under his birth name – Run Fast Sleep Naked was released in April 2019. This was followed up by a surprise instrumental album, Music for Silence, in March 2020, initially released via the Calm meditation app.

In October 2020, four years after dropping the moniker, Murphy revived the Chet Faker name for the release of a new single, "Low".

Career

Early career 

Murphy played under his stage name after people came to his shows thinking he was a different and already established musician, Nick Murphy. He settled on the name as a homage to Chet Baker: "I listened to a lot of jazz and I was a big fan of ... the way he sang, when he moved into mainstream singing. He had this really fragile vocal style—this really, broken, close-up and intimate style. The name is kind of just an ode to Chet Baker and the mood of music he used to play—something I would like to at least pay homage to in my own music." Other influences he has cited include Bob Dylan, as well as his mother's Motown albums and his father's "chilled out Ibiza CDs".

Thinking in Textures and collaborations (2011–13) 

He first rose to prominence after his cover of Blackstreet's "No Diggity" went viral online, reaching number one on the Hypemachine chart in May 2011. He released his first extended play, Thinking in Textures, on 22 March 2012 to positive reviews, being described as "wonderfully loungey" and praised for its ability to "mix subtlety with impressive beauty". The EP was also popular with fans, with its second single, "I'm into You", landing at number 24 on Triple J's Hottest 100 of 2012.

Murphy has collaborated with Flume and remixes of songs by MS MR and The Temper Trap. He was a featured vocalist on Say Lou Lou's "Fool of Me", which was named Best New Track by Pitchfork in May 2013.

Lockjaw EP and Built on Glass (2013–15) 

On 12 August 2013, Murphy released a new single, "Melt", featuring American vocalist Kilo Kish. In November 2013 Flume and Murphy released an EP, titled Lockjaw. Murphy released his debut studio album, Built on Glass, on 11 April 2014. The album's full release was preceded by its lead single, "Talk Is Cheap", and an accompanying music video on 11 February 2014. The album debuted at number one on the ARIA Charts.

Murphy performed at the Boston Calling Music Festival in May 2015. Later that month, "Talk Is Cheap" was named the number-one song in the 2014 Triple J Hottest 100, while two other singles, "Gold" and "1998", also reached the top ten, placing at number 7 and 8, respectively. In June, Murphy released a new single, "Bend", a previously unreleased track intended for Built on Glass. It was promoted by his Australian Built on Live tour in October.

Murphy released a new EP, Work, a collaboration with London-based DJ Marcus Marr on 4 December 2015.

Nick Murphy (2016–2019) 

On 8 September 2016, the artist wrote on his Facebook page, "It's been half a decade since I started releasing music as Chet Faker and all of you have been the driving force behind the music since. There's an evolution happening and I wanted to let you know where it's going. The next record will be under my own name, Nick Murphy. Chet Faker will always be a part of the music. This is next."

Chet Faker revival (2020)
In October 2020, Murphy revived the Chet Faker social media accounts and released "Low", his first single under the Chet Faker moniker since 2016. This marked his first release through BMG Australia & New Zealand, with whom he had recently signed a record deal.

Discography

Studio albums

Live albums

Extended plays

Singles

As lead artist

Notes

As featured artist

Promotional singles

Other charted songs

Other appearances

Production

Remixes

Music videos

As lead artist

As featured artist

Awards and nominations

A2IM Libera Awards 

!
|-
| 2015
| Chet Faker
| Breakthrough Artist of the Year
| 
|

AIR Awards 
The Australian Independent Record Awards (commonly known informally as AIR Awards) is an annual awards night to recognise, promote and celebrate the success of Australia's Independent Music sector.

!
|-
| rowspan="5" | AIR Awards of 2012
| rowspan="2" | Chet Faker
| Best Independent Artist
| 
| rowspan="5" | 
|-
| Breakthrough Independent Artist
| 
|-
| rowspan="2" | Thinking in Textures
| Best Independent Single/EP
| 
|-
| Best Independent Dance/Electronica Album
| 
|-
| "Terms and Conditions"
| Best Independent Dance/Electronica Single
| 
|-
| rowspan="3" | AIR Awards of 2014
| Chet Faker
| Best Independent Artist
| 
| rowspan="3" | 
|-
| rowspan="2" | Built on Glass
| Best Independent Album
| 
|-
| Best Independent Dance/Electronica Album
| 
|-
| AIR Awards of 2015
| Chet Faker
| Best Independent Artist
| 
| 
|-
| AIR Awards of 2017
| "Stop Me (Stop You)"
| Best Independent Dance/Electronic Club Song or EP
| 
|

APRA Awards (Australia) 

The APRA Awards are presented annually from 1982 by the Australasian Performing Right Association (APRA) and Australasian Mechanical Copyright Owners Society (AMCOS).

!
|-
| 2014
| "Drop the Game" (with Flume) 
| Song of the Year
| 
| 
|-
| rowspan="5" | 2015
| "1998" (Chet Faker)
| rowspan="3" | Song of the Year
| 
| rowspan="3" | 
|-
| "Gold" (Chet Faker)
| 
|-
| "Talk Is Cheap" (Chet Faker)
| 
|-
| Chet Faker
| Breakthrough Songwriter of the Year
| 
| 
|-
| "Drop the Game" 
| Dance Work of the Year
| 
| 
|-
| rowspan="2" | 2017
| rowspan="2" | "The Trouble With Us" 
| Dance Work of the Year
| 
| 
|-
| Most Played Australian Work
| 
|

ARIA Awards 

Chet Faker received nine nominations at the ARIA Music Awards of 2014,

|-
| rowspan="9" | 2014 || rowspan="7" | Built on Glass || Album of the Year ||  
|-
| Best Male Artist ||  
|-
| Breakthrough Artist || 
|-
| Best Independent Release ||  
|-
| Engineer of the Year  ||  
|-
| Producer of the Year  ||  
|-
| Best Cover Art  ||  
|-
| "Talk Is Cheap" || Best Video  ||  
|-
| "Drop the Game"  || Best Dance Release ||  
|-
| 2016 || "The Trouble With Us (with Marcus Marr)" || Song of the Year ||

Australian Music Prize
The Australian Music Prize (the AMP) is an annual award of $30,000 given to an Australian band or solo artist in recognition of the merit of an album released during the year of award. The AMP was established in 2005.

|-
| 2014
| Built on Glass
| Australian Music Prize
| 
|-

EG Awards / Music Victoria Awards
The EG Awards (known as Music Victoria Awards since 2013) are an annual awards night celebrating Victorian music. They commenced in 2006.

|-
|rowspan="4"| EG Awards of 2012
|  "No Diggity"
| Best Song
| 
|-
| Chet Faker
| Best Male
| 
|-
| Chet Faker
| Best New Talent
| 
|-
| Chet Faker
| Outstanding Achievement By a Victorian Artist
| 
|-
|rowspan="2"| Music Victoria Awards of 2014
| Chet Faker
| Best Male
| 
|-
| Chet Faker
| Best Electronic Act
| 
|-

J Award
The J Awards are an annual series of Australian music awards that were established by the Australian Broadcasting Corporation's youth-focused radio station Triple J. The J Awards were established in 2005.

|-
| J Awards of 2014
|"Talk Is Cheap"
| Australian Video of the Year
|

Helpmann Awards
The Helpmann Awards is an awards show, celebrating live entertainment and performing arts in Australia, presented by industry group Live Performance Australia since 2001. Note: 2020 and 2021 were cancelled due to the COVID-19 pandemic.
 

! 
|-
| 2015
| Chet Faker – National Tour 2015
| Helpmann Award for Best Australian Contemporary Concert
| 
|
|-

MTV Video Music Awards 

!
|-
| 2015
| "Gold"
| Best Choreography 
| 
|

Rolling Stone Australia Awards
The Rolling Stone Australia Awards are awarded annually in January or February by the Australian edition of Rolling Stone magazine for outstanding contributions to popular culture in the previous year.

! 
|-
| 2012
| Thinking in Textures
| Best Independent Release
| 
| 
|-
| 2021
| "Low"
| Best Single
| 
| 
|-

References

External links
 
 

1988 births
Australian electronic musicians
Australian soul singers
Australian singer-songwriters
Trip hop musicians
ARIA Award winners
People from Melbourne
Living people
Downtempo musicians
21st-century Australian singers
21st-century Australian male singers
Downtown Records artists
Remote Control Records artists
MapleMusic Recordings artists
Australian male singer-songwriters
People educated at St Kevin's College, Melbourne